Hugo García may refer to:

 Hugo García (water polo) (1914-unknown), Uruguayan water polo player
 Hugo García (footballer) (born 1981), Mexican football manager and former player